Tusitala unica is a jumping spider that lives in Tanzania.

References

Endemic fauna of Tanzania
Salticidae
Spiders of Africa
Spiders described in 2000
Fauna of Tanzania